England is a city in southwestern Lonoke County, Arkansas, United States and the county's fourth most populous city. The population was 2,825 at the 2010 census. It is part of the Little Rock–North Little Rock–Conway Metropolitan Statistical Area.

Geography
According to the United States Census Bureau, the city has a total area of 1.9 square miles (4.8 km), all land.

Demographics

2020 census

As of the 2020 United States census, there were 2,477 people, 1,026 households, and 667 families residing in the city.

2000 census
At the 2000 census there were 2,972 people in 1,183 households, including 830 families, in the city. The racial makeup of the city was 65.51% White, 33.18% Black or African American, 0.37% Native American, 0.10% Asian, 0.10% from other races, and 0.74% from two or more races. 0.84% of the population were Hispanic or Latino of any race.
Of the 1,183 households 32.6% had children under the age of 18 living with them, 46.7% were married couples living together, 19.8% had a female householder with no husband present, and 29.8% were non-families. 26.7% of households were one person and 13.7% were one person aged 65 or older. The average household size was 2.51 and the average family size was 3.03.

The age distribution was 27.1% under the age of 18, 9.3% from 18 to 24, 26.6% from 25 to 44, 20.8% from 45 to 64, and 16.2% 65 or older. The median age was 36 years. For every 100 females, there were 83.9 males. For every 100 females age 18 and over, there were 78.7 males.

The median household income was $28,516 and the median family income  was $34,335. Males had a median income of $26,449 versus $18,500 for females. The per capita income for the city was $14,095. About 14.7% of families and 17.9% of the population were below the poverty line, including 21.9% of those under age 18 and 21.8% of those age 65 or over.

Economy
The Arkansas Department of Correction operates the Willis H. Sargent Training Academy in England.

Sports
England is home of the England Lions.

Education
The England Public School District is headquartered in and serves England, with students graduating from England High School.

Notable people
Charles Capps, Pentecostal minister and televangelist.
Country music artists Arlene, Bobby and Robbie Harden, also known as The Harden Trio, were born in England, Arkansas.

References

External links

Cities in Arkansas
Cities in Lonoke County, Arkansas
Cities in Little Rock–North Little Rock–Conway metropolitan area